This is a list of buildings with 100 floors or more above ground. Dubai and Chicago have three buildings with at least 100 floors.

Completed buildings 
This list includes buildings whose construction is complete, or are topped-out.

Buildings under construction 
This is a list of buildings under construction that are planned to have 100 floors or more. It does not include proposed, approved and topped-out buildings.

Buildings cancelled 
The following list is of those buildings that were planned to have 100 floors or more, for which the project did start but is now officially cancelled.

Proposed buildings 
The list includes buildings that were proposed or envisioned to have 100 floors or more, yet have advanced to the construction stage. It does not include never built, under construction buildings.

Destroyed buildings 
This list comprises the two buildings that used to have over 100 floors but are no longer in existence.

Timeline 
This is a timeline of the building with the most floors out of buildings with 100 floors or more.

See also 
 List of tallest buildings in the world
 List of tallest buildings by height to roof
 Skyscraper design and construction

References 

 Structures
Lists of construction records